The 1946 Boston Red Sox season was the 46th season in the franchise's Major League Baseball history. The Red Sox finished first in the American League (AL) with a record of 104 wins and 50 losses.  This was the team's sixth AL championship, and their first since 1918. In the 1946 World Series, the Red Sox lost to the National League (NL) champion St. Louis Cardinals, whose winning run in the seventh game was scored on Enos Slaughter's famous "Mad Dash".

Regular season

Overview
The 1946 Red Sox were led by their All-Star left fielder, Ted Williams, who was in his first year back in the majors after serving as a fighter pilot in World War II.  1946 was Ted Williams first of two MVP seasons, and the only time he ever won a pennant.  He was among the league leaders in many offensive categories, with a batting average of .342, 38 home runs and 123 runs batted in.

On April 24, the Red Sox were 6–3, 1 game behind the Yankees and tied for second with the defending world series champion Tigers.  Then, from April 25 through May 10, they won 15 games in a row, beating the Yankees twice and sweeping the Tigers in a three-game series.  Over this stretch Ted Williams had a batting average of .442, with 4 home runs and 17 runs batted in.  On May 10 the Red Sox were 21–3 and leading the American League, 5.5 games ahead of the Yankees and 8 games ahead of the Tigers.  This was their biggest lead in 28 seasons, since winning their last pennant in 1918.  The fans took notice as the Red Sox had their highest attendance ever, nearly doubling their previous record.  For the first time in Fenway Park history the Red Sox were averaging over 10,000 fans per game, averaging 18,166 fans per game throughout 1946.

The Red Sox never turned back, winning 12 straight decisions from May 29 through June 11, including their second three-game sweep of the Tigers. On June 11, the Red Sox were 41–9, 10 games ahead of the Yankees.  From June 5 through July 21, in 48 games, Ted Williams had a batting average of .399, with 18 home runs and 52 runs batted in.  The Red Sox swept the Tigers for the third time that year on July 11–13.  On July 14, Williams hit three home runs in a game. The Red Sox swept their rivals, the Yankees, in a double-header at Yankee Stadium on September 2, expanding their lead to 15.5 games ahead of the Yankees and 18 games ahead of the Tigers.  The Red Sox clinched the American League pennant on September 13.  It was their first pennant since 1918, when they won the World Series.  The Red Sox ended the season 12 games ahead of the Tigers and 17 games ahead of the Yankees.

The Red Sox played a three-game series against an American League all star team following the end of the regular season and the beginning of the World Series. While the Red Sox had clinched in September, the St Louis Cardinals and Brooklyn Dodgers would play a three-game playoff for the National League pennant, pushing back the start of the World Series. The Red Sox hosted the three game exhibition series beginning October 1, 1946, at Fenway Park. The Red Sox won two of three, but Williams exacerbated his injury which would plague him in the Series against St. Louis.

Season standings

Record vs. opponents

Opening Day lineup

Notable transactions
 July 1946: Don Lang and Bill Howerton were traded by the Red Sox to the St. Louis Cardinals for Jim Gleeson.
 July 23, 1946: Wally Moses was purchased by the Red Sox from the Chicago White Sox.

Roster

Player stats

Batting

Starters by position
Note: Pos = Position; G = Games played; AB = At bats; H = Hits; Avg. = Batting average; HR = Home runs; RBI = Runs batted in

Other batters
Note: G = Games played; AB = At bats; H = Hits; Avg. = Batting average; HR = Home runs; RBI = Runs batted in

Pitching

Starting pitchers
Note: G = Games pitched; IP = Innings pitched; W = Wins; L = Losses; ERA = Earned run average; SO = Strikeouts

Other pitchers
Note: G = Games pitched; IP = Innings pitched; W = Wins; L = Losses; ERA = Earned run average; SO = Strikeouts

Relief pitchers
Note: G = Games pitched; W = Wins; L = Losses; SV = Saves; ERA = Earned run average; SO = Strikeouts

1946 World Series 

NL St. Louis Cardinals (4) vs. AL Boston Red Sox (3)

Farm system

LEAGUE CHAMPIONS: Louisville, Scranton

Source:

Salem franchise moved to Lenoir on June 25, 1946

 Noel Casbier is listed as the sole manager for Salem/Lenoir by Baseball-Reference.com

Notes

References

Further reading

External links
1946 Boston Red Sox team page at Baseball Reference
1946 Boston Red Sox season at baseball-almanac.com

Boston Red Sox seasons
Boston Red Sox
Boston Red Sox
1940s in Boston
American League champion seasons